The 2008 season was the Hawthorn Football Club's 84th season in the Australian Football League and 107th overall.

Playing list changes

Draft

AFL draft

Rookie draft

Retirements and delistings

2008 player squad

Fixture

NAB Cup

Premiership season

Ladder

Finals series

See also
 2008 AFL season
 Hawthorn Football Club

References

External links
 Official Website of the Hawthorn Football Club
 Official Website of the Australian Football League 

2008 in Australian rules football
2008
2008 Australian Football League season